The Brigade van Bylandt was a Dutch infantry brigade led by major general Willem Frederik Graaf van Bylandt which fought in the Waterloo Campaign (1815).

Formation
On March 25, 1815, the mobile corps of the Kingdom of the Netherlands received its organizational details. The infantry of the army was divided into three divisions, each of them divided into two brigades. The 1st division was commanded by General Stedman, the 3rd by General Chassé. The 2nd Division was to be commanded by General Perponcher, who was then Minister of the Netherlands in Berlin. His first brigade was placed under the orders of Colonel Bylandt. The brigade was the 1st Brigade of the 2nd Dutch Division (Baron de Perponcher-Sedlnitzky's) of the Anglo-allied I Corps (Prince of Orange's) in the Duke of Wellington's Anglo-allied army. On April 8, Colonel van Zuylen was appointed chief of staff.

At the start of the Waterloo Campaign, the Brigade as part of the I Corps was cantoned to the south-east of Brussels. The brigade consisted of:
 27th Light Battalion (Bataljon Jagers, 550 men), commanded by Lieutenant Colonel J.W. Grunebosch
 Dutch 7th Infantry Battalion (701 men), commanded by Lieutenant Colonel F.C. van den Sande
 Dutch 5th National Militia Battalion (220 men), commanded by Lieutenant ColonelJ.J.Westenberg
 Dutch 7th National Militia Battalion (675 men), commanded by Lieutenant Colonel H. Singendonck
 Dutch 8th National Militia Battalion (566 men), commanded by Lieutenant Colonel W.A. de Jongh.

Waterloo Campaign
The brigade fought in both the Battle of Quatre Bras and the Battle of Waterloo in June 1815 against the French Army of the North commanded by Napoleon Bonaparte.

On 15 June Nassau units of the 2nd Brigade were engaged by the vanguard of the French army's left wing; which developed into the Battle of Quatre Bras where the Brigade van Bylandt played a major role during the morning and early afternoon of 16 June 1815. As a consequence of their prolonged involvement in combat, the van Bylandt Brigade ended the engagement as the most battered and decimated unit among the Allies.

After the battle the Anglo-allied army deployed at the escarpment near Mont-Saint-Jean. The Brigade van Bylandt was placed in front of Picton's division in an advanced position at the Battle of Waterloo. There has never been provided a satisfactory explanation, why this brigade was deployed in such a manner, that it was permanently exposed to French artillery fire.
On the part of Wellington it was legitimate to be wary of the loyalty of the Belgian and Dutch troops, as some had fought in the ranks of the French army and the Swiss General Rebecque had disobeyed a direct order from Wellington at Quatre Bras. However, most of the non-British contingents of the Anglo-Allied had been placed in front-line positions, while the British units had deployed in the second line - relatively save from artillery - beyond the Mont St. Jean ridge.

Many British historians and authors have repeatedly criticized the Dutch, Belgian and German troops for their, in opposition to the British contingents, low morale, shameful conduct in combat and even cowardice, generally based on the reports of British officers, such as Kennedy. The alleged retreat of parts of the van Bylandt's Brigade upon the French infantry attack at La Haye Sainte has been particularly condemned. However authors from other backgrounds have concluded, that with regard to their already weakened condition, Wellington's mistrust and the local isolation and exposure, these men fought indeed valiantly. Napoleon himself had observed...that heroic determination of the Prince of Orange as to be an essential force of conquest.

At around 1:30 p.m. four infantry divisions of d'Erlon's I Corps advanced towards Picton's division and attacked the brigades of van Bylandt and Pack. Supported by massive artillery fire the French divisions of Donzelot and Marcognet drove right into the Dutch and Belgian defenders. As some troops were forced to fall back, the brigades stood their ground and stopped the French advance. Van Bylandt, van Zuylen and most of the division's commanders were wounded and the eventual counterattack was executed under the command of Captain Bast.

After the Battle of Waterloo the Allied army marched on Paris, where Emperor Bonaparte would eventually abdicate which finally ended a 25-year period of war.

References

Barbero, Allesandro (2006), The Battle: A new history of Waterloo, Walker & Company.
Boulder, Demetrius C. (2005), The Belgians at Waterloo.
Muilwijk, Erwin (2012), 1815 – From mobilisation to war, Souvereign House Books, Bleiswijk.
Muilwijk, Erwin (2013), Quatre Bras – Perponcher's gamble', Souvereign House Books, Bleiswijk.
Muilwijk, Erwin (2014), Standing firm at Waterloo, Souvereign House Books, Bleiswijk.
Op de Beeck, Johan (2013), Waterloo – De laatste 100 dagen van Napoleon, Manteau Uitgeverij.
Pawly, Ronald (2001), Wellington's Belgian allies, Osprey Publishing.
Pawly, Ronald (2002), Wellington's Dutch allies 1815, Osprey Publishing.

External links
 The 'Cowards' at Waterloo – Webpage describing the Belgo-Dutch performance and actions during Quatre Bras and Waterloo
 

Brigades of the Netherlands
Military units and formations established in 1815